The 1994 Montana Grizzlies football team was an American football team that represented the University of Montana in the Big Sky Conference during the 1994 NCAA Division I-AA football season. In their ninth year under head coach Don Read, the team compiled a 11–3 record.

Schedule

References

Montana
Montana Grizzlies football seasons
Montana Grizzlies football